James W. Prescott (born January 21, 1934) is an American developmental psychologist,  whose research focused on the origins of violence, particularly as it relates to a lack of mother-child bonding.

Prescott was a health scientist administrator at the National Institute of Child Health and Human Development (NICHD), one of the Institutes of the US National Institutes of Health (NIH) from 1966 to 1980. He created and directed the Developmental Behavioral Biology Program at the NICHD where he initiated NICHD-supported research programs to study the relationship between mother-child bonding and the development of social abilities in adult life. Inspired by Harry Harlow's famous experiments on rhesus monkeys, which established a link between neurotic behavior and isolation from a care-giving mother, Prescott further proposed that a key component to development comes from the somesthetic processes (body touch) and vestibular-cerebellar processes (body movement) induced by mother-child interactions, and that deprivation of this stimulation causes brain abnormalities. By analogy to the neurotic behavior in monkeys, he suggested that these developmental abnormalities are a major cause of adult violence amongst humans.

Prescott also served as assistant head of the Psychology Branch of the Office of Naval Research (1963 to 1966) and as president of the Maryland Psychological Association (1970 to 1971). In 1973 he was one of the signers of the Humanist Manifesto.

Prescott's findings about origins of child abuse was innovative, groundbreaking, and controversial. In 1978, Hustler Magazine published an article by Prescott with shocking photos of actual abused children. Dr. Prescott supported this publication of his work in order to reach an audience outside of the scientific community. For this, NICHD fired Prescott, and he protested in front of the U.S. Senate and House Appropriations Committee. Prescott testified that "we are producing more criminals . . . 'by the manner in which we are raising our children ... than we will be able to house in all the prisons that we can build.'"

References

External links

Touch The Future: Blog
Violence.de: Bio page and bibliography

21st-century American psychologists
1934 births
Living people
20th-century American psychologists